The cinema of Greece has a long and rich history. Though hampered at times by war or political instability, the Greek film industry dominates the domestic market and has experienced international success. Characteristics of Greek cinema include a dynamic plot, strong character development and erotic themes. Two Greek films, Missing (1982) and Eternity and a Day (1998), have won the Palme d'Or at the Cannes Film Festival.  Five Greek films have received nominations for the Academy Award for Best Foreign Language Film.

Though Greek cinema took root in the early 1900s, the first mature films weren't produced until the 1920s, after the end of the Greco-Turkish War.  Films during this period, such as Astero (1929) by Dimitris Gaziadis and Maria Pentagiotissa (1929) by Ahilleas Madras, consisted of emotional melodramas with an abundance of folkloristic elements.  Orestis Laskos's Daphnis and Chloe (1931), one of the first Greek films to be shown abroad, contained the first voyeuristic nude scene in a European film.  During the Axis occupation, the Greek film industry struggled as it was forced to relocate overseas.

Following the Greek Civil War, Greek cinema experienced a revival.  Inspired by Italian neorealism, directors such as Grigoris Grigoriou and Stelios Tatasopoulos created works during this period shot on location using non-professional actors. During the 1950s and 1960s, Greek cinema experienced a golden age, starting with Michael Cacoyannis's Stella (1955), which was screened at Cannes.  The 1960 film Never on Sunday was nominated for five Academy Awards, and its lead actress, Melina Mercouri, won the Best Actress Award at Cannes.  Cacoyannis's Zorba the Greek (1964) won three Academy Awards. Other films released in this era, such as The Counterfeit Coin and The Ogre of Athens are nowadays considered some of the greatest works of Greek cinema.

Censorship policies of the 1967 junta and rising foreign competition led to a decline in Greek cinema.  After the restoration of democracy in the mid-1970s, the Greek film industry again flourished, led by director Theo Angelopoulos, whose films captured international recognition, making him probably the most acclaimed Greek director to date. Other acclaimed directors of this era include Nikos Nikolaidis, as well as Pantelis Voulgaris and Alexis Damianos, the director of the landmark film Evdokia. However, this drift toward art-house cinema in the 1980s led to a decline in audiences.  In the 1990s, younger Greek filmmakers began experimenting with iconographic motifs.  In spite of, or because of, funding issues created by the financial crisis in the late 2000s, unique Greek films such as Yorgos Lanthimos's Dogtooth (2009), Panos H. Koutras' Strella (2009) and Athina Rachel Tsangari's Attenberg (2010) received international acclaim, constituting what has been called the "Greek Weird Wave".

History of the Greek cinema

Origins
In the spring of 1897, the Greeks of Athens watched the first cinematic ventures (short movies in "journal"). In 1906 Greek Cinema was born when the Manakis brothers started recording in Macedonia, and the French filmmaker "Leons" produced the first "Newscast" from the midi-Olympic games of Athens (the unofficial Olympic games of 1906).

The first cine-theater of Athens opened about a year later and other special 'projection rooms' begun their activity. In 1910-11 the first short comic movies were produced by director Spiros Dimitrakopoulos (Spyridion), who also starred in most of his movies. In 1911 Kostas Bachatoris presented Golfo, a well known traditional love story, considered the first Greek feature film. In 1912 was founded the first film company (Athina Film) and in 1916 the Asty Film.

During the First World War, production was limited to documentaries and newscasts only. Directors like George Prokopiou and Dimitris Gaziadis are distinguished for filming scenes from the battlefield and later, during the Greco-Turkish War, of the efforts of the Hellenic Army and finally the Great Fire of Smyrna (1922).

The first commercially successful Greek film was Villar in the Women's Baths of Faliro, written, directed by and starring comedian Villar (Nikolaos Sfakianakis) and Nitsa Philosofou. In 1924, Michael Michael (1895–1944), a Greek comedian, presented some short film comedies.

In 1922, Gaziadis founded Dag Films and tried to produce the first speaking movies. This company presented its first movie, Love and Waves (Eros kai kymata), in 1927, and experienced moderate success in the late 1920s and early 1930s. The company mainly produced historical movies, usually adaptations of novels. In 1930, Dag made an attempt for a speaking movie, Apachides of Athens (Oi Apachides ton Athinon), which was based on a Greek operetta by Nikos Hatziapostolou.

Gaziadis also filmed the 1927 Delphic Festival, an idea of Angelos Sikelianos and Eva Palmer-Sikelianos, as part of his general effort towards the revival of the "Delphic Idea". The event consisted of Olympic contests, an exhibition of folk art, and a performance of Prometheus Bound.

The 1931 film Daphnis and Chloe (Δάφνις και Χλόη), directed by Orestis Laskos (1908–1992), contained the first voyeuristic nude scene in the history of European cinema; it was also the first Greek movie which was played abroad. In 1932 Olympia Films presented the speaking movie The Shepherdess's Lover (Ο αγαπητικός της βοσκοπούλας), which was based on a play by Dimitris Koromilas.  Also influential during this period was director Achilleas Madras, whose work included Maria Pentagiotissa (1929) and Sorcerer of Athens (1931).

During the late 1930s, a number of Greek filmmakers fled Greece due to the hostility of Metaxas Regime and the material lack of ability for producing speaking movies. The Greek film industry reemerged in Turkey, and later in Egypt.

In spite of German occupation during World War II, Philopemen Finos, a film producer who was active in the Greek Resistance, founded Finos Films (1942), which would later become one of the most commercially successful Greek studios. One of Finos's earliest productions, Voice of the Heart (1943, directed by Dimitris Ioannopoulos), drew large audiences, to the consternation of the Germans.  Another important film during this period, Applause (1944, directed by George Tzavellas), was produced by Finos's rival, Novak Films.

In 1944 Katina Paxinou was honoured with the Academy Award for Best Supporting Actress for her role as "Pilar" in the Sam Wood film, For Whom the Bell Tolls.

The Golden Age (modern period)

The 1950s and 1960s are considered by many to be the "Golden Age" of Greek cinema. Directors and actors of this era were recognized as important historical figures in Greece and some gained international acclaim: Michael Cacoyannis, Alekos Sakellarios, Melina Mercouri, Nikos Tsiforos, Iakovos Kambanelis, Katina Paxinou, Nikos Koundouros, Ellie Lambeti, and Irene Papas. More than sixty films per year were made, with the majority having film noir elements. Notable films were The Counterfeit Coin (1955 directed by George Tzavellas), Bitter Bread (1951, directed by Grigoris Grigoriou), and The Ogre of Athens (1956, directed by Nikos Koundouros).

Finos Film and director Alekos Sakellarios collaborated on several films in the late 1950s, namely The Hurdy-Gurdy (1955) and its sequel, Laterna, ftoheia kai garyfallo (1958), as well as Aunt from Chicago (1957) and Maiden's Cheek (1959).

The 1955 film Stella, directed by Michael Cacoyannis and written by Iakovos Kambanelis, was screened at Cannes, and launched Greek cinema into its "golden age." Melina Mercouri, who starred in the film, met American expatriate director Jules Dassin at Cannes while attending the screening, and the two would eventually marry.  Dassin directed the 1960 Greek film, Never on Sunday, which starred Mercouri.  The film was nominated for several Academy Awards, including Best Actress for Mercouri, and won the Academy Award for Best Song for composer Manos Hatzidakis' title track.  The couple also collaborated on the 1967 musical stage adaptation, Illya Darling, for which Mercouri received a Tony Award nomination. She went on to star in such films as Topkapi and Phaedra, both directed by Dassin, and the 1969 American comedy, Gaily, Gaily.

Cacoyannis' 1964 film, Zorba the Greek, which starred Anthony Quinn, was a major commercial success, and was nominated for the Academy Awards for Best Director, Best Adapted Screenplay and Best Film. The movie was based on the novel, Zorba the Greek, by author Nikos Kazantzakis.  Other important films during this period include Antigone (1961) and Electra (1962), both of which starred Irene Papas, The Red Lanterns (1963) by director Vasilis Georgiadis, and Battlefield Constantinople (1970), which starred the "Greek Brigitte Bardot," Aliki Vougiouklaki.

The Thessaloniki International Film Festival was first held in 1960, and would subsequently evolve into the primary showcase for emerging filmmakers from Greece and the Balkans region.  The festival showcases both international and Greek films, and awards the "Golden Alexander" for the best feature film.

In 1969, the Costa-Gavras film Z was nominated for the Academy Award for both Best Foreign Language Film and Best Picture.

Postmodern period

The production of Greek films increased after the fall of the dictatorship in the mid-1970s, though the industry struggled with foreign competition and the rise of television.   Michael Cacoyannis' 1977 film, Iphigenia, was nominated for an Oscar for Best Foreign Language Film.  During the 1970s and 1980s Theo Angelopoulos directed a series of critically acclaimed movies, among them The Travelling Players (1975), The Hunters (1977), and Voyage to Cythera (1984). His film Eternity and a Day won the Palme d'Or and the Prize of the Ecumenical Jury at the 1998 Cannes Film Festival.  Costa-Gavras's film Missing won the Palme d'Or at 1982 Cannes Film Festival.  Director Costas Ferris's 1983 film, Rembetiko, won the Silver Bear at the Berlin International Film Festival.

When the left-leaning Panhellenic Socialist Movement was elected to power in 1981, actress Melina Mercouri, a member of the party, was appointed Minister for Culture.  In this role, she obtained government support for the Greek film industry, and set up networks to promote Greek cinema abroad.  The increase in government funding led to a predominance of slow-moving, cerebral art-house films, which lacked mass appeal.

Beginning in the 1990s, younger directors turned to more contemporary-paced films and social satires, which brought moderate commercial success.  In 1999, TV series writers Michalis Reppas and Thanasis Papathanasiou, collaborating with contemporary famous actors made the sex taboo comedy Safe Sex, which was the most successful movie of the decade.

In 2003, A Touch of Spice (Politiki kouzina), a big-budget film by director Tasos Boulmetis, was the most successful film of the year at the Greek box office, making over 12 million euros. 2004 was also a good year for Greek films, with Pantelis Voulgaris's Brides (Nyfes) gathering more than a million spectators and over 7 million at the box office. In 2007 the most successful film was El Greco, directed by Yannis Smaragdis.

In 2009, Dogtooth, directed by Yorgos Lanthimos, won the Prix Un Certain Regard at the Cannes Film Festival, and in 2011 was nominated for Best Foreign Language Film at the 83rd Academy Awards. The 2010 film Attenberg, directed by Athina Rachel Tsangari, won the Coppa Volpi Award for Best Actress (Ariane Labed) at the Venice Film Festival. Also, at the same festival that year, Homeland, directed by Syllas Tzoumerkas screened at the International Critics' Week, Plato's Academy by Filippos Tsitos screened at a special event in Venice Days, and Casus Belli, a short film by director Yorgos Zois, screened at the Orizzonti section, prompting Nick Vivarelli of Variety to write about "the country's biggest showing in decades". In 2011 Alps won the Osella Award for Best Screenplay (Yorgos Lanthimos and Efthimiοs Filippou) at the 68th Venice Film Festival.  Dogtooth, Attenberg and Alps are part of what some film critics, including Steve Rose of The Guardian, have termed the "Greek Weird Wave," which involves movies with haunting cinematography, alienated protagonists and absurdist dialogue.  Other films mentioned as part of this "wave" include Panos H. Koutras's Strella (2009) and Yannis Economides's Knifer (2010). In 2011, the 46th Karlovy Vary International Film Festival presented a tribute to Young Greek Cinema with seven feature films: Attenberg, Dogtooth, Homeland, Strella, Tale 52 (directed by Alexis Alexiou) and Wasted Youth (directed by Argyris Papadimitropoulos and Jan Vogel).

The "wave" of Greek cinema continued its course through the decade, producing several titles that were festival and critical sensations and were distributed in many countries. Many tributes to this generation of Greek filmmakers were held by festivals worldwide, most notably by the New Horizons Film Festival in Wrocław, Poland, and the Jeonju International Film Festival in Korea. Recent studies called the Greek Weird Wave, a cinema "that reflects on how systems of power manage groups of people (from a family to a population) and the bodies of individuals", and "a cinema equally sensitive to forms of response, to noise, unease, and subversion".

In 2011, just twenty feature-films were produced. Wasted Youth, directed by Argyris Papadimitropoulos and Jan Vogel was the opening film of the 40th Rotterdam International Film Festival, Alps, directed by Yorgos Lanthimos won the Best Screenplay Award at the Venice International Film Festival and Unfair World, directed by Filippos Tsitos won the Best Actor Award for Antonis Kafetzopoulos at the San Sebastian International Film Festival.

In 2012, L by Babis Makridis premiered in competition at the Rotterdam International Film Festival, and Boy Eating the Bird's Food, directed by Ektoras Lygizos, premiered in competition at the Karlovy Vary International Film Festival, winning a Special Mention for actor Yannis Papadopoulos.

In 2013, Miss Violence, directed by Alexandros Avranas won Silver Lion for best director at the 70th Venice International Film Festival. Peter Bradshaw of The Guardian, compared the film to the previously mentioned, saying that "It (self-evidently) does not have the humour of those movies by Yorgos Lanthimos and Athina Rachel Tsangari and by that token, less of their richness and inventiveness. But its force can't be doubted."

In 2014, Stratos, directed by Yannis Economidis premiered in competition at the Berlin International Film Festival, Xenia, directed by Panos H. Koutras, premiered at the Un Certain Régard section of the Cannes Film Festival, and A Blast, directed by Syllas Tzoumerkas, premiered in competition at the Locarno International Film Festival.

In 2015, Wednesday 04:45 by Alexis Alexiou premiered in competition at the Tribeca Film Festival, Chevalier, directed by Athina Rachel Tsangari premiered in competition at the Locarno International Film Festival and won the Best Film Award at the BFI - London International Film Festival, and Interruption by Yorgos Zois premiered at the Orizzonti competition section of the Venice International Film Festival.

In 2016, Suntan by Argyris Papadimitropoulos premiered at the Rotterdam and SXSW International Film Festivals and won the Best Film Award at the Edinburgh International Film Festival.

In 2017, Son of Sofia, directed by Elina Psykou won the Best International Narrative Feature Award at the Tribeca Film Festival.

In 2018, Pity, directed by Babis Makridis, premiered in competition at the Sundance and the Rotterdam International Film Festivals.

in 2021, Jacqueline Lentzou's Moon, 66 Questions premiered at the Encounters competition section of the 71st Berlin International Film Festival.

Notable films

Pre-WWII
 1914 Golfo, Konstantinos Bachatoris (the first Greek feature film)
 1927 Eros kai kymata, Dimitris Gaziadis
 1930 Oi Apachides ton Athinon, Dimitris Gaziadis
 1931 Daphnis and Chloe, Orestis Laskos
 1932 Shepherdess's Lover, Dimitris Tsakiris (first speaking)  
 1939 The Parting Song (film) by Filopimin Finos
 1944 Chirokrotimata, George Tzavellas

After-WWII (Golden Age)
 1948 The Germans are coming again, Alekos Sakellarios, starring Vassilis Logothetidis
 1950 The Drunkard, George Tzavellas, starring Orestis Makris
 1951 Pikro Psomi, Grigoris Grigoriou
 1954 Despoinis eton 39, Alekos Sakellarios
 1954 Kiriakatiko Xipnima, Cacoyannis
 1955 Stella, Michael Cacoyannis, starring Melina Mercouri
 1955 The Counterfeit Coin, George Tzavellas
 1956 Thanassakis o politevomenos, Alekos Sakellarios
 1956 Aces of the Stadiums, Vasilis Georgiadis
 1956 O Drakos, Nikos Koundouros, starring Dinos Iliopoulos
 1956 A Girl in Black, Michael Cacoyannis, starring Ellie Lambeti
 1956 The Girl from Corfu, Yiannis Petropoulakis, starring Rena Vlachopoulou (the first colour film)
 1957 I theia ap' to Chicago, Alekos Sakellarios, starring Georgia Vasileiadou
 1958 A Hero in His Slippers, Alekos Sakellarios, starring Vassilis Logothetidis
 1959 Astero, Dinos Dimopoulos
 1959 Stournara 288, Dinos Dimopoulos
 1959 Elias of the 16th, Alekos Sakellarios, starring Costas Hajihristos
 1960 Madalena, Dinos Dimopoulos, starring Aliki Vougiouklaki
 1960 Never on Sunday, Jules Dassin
 1960 Egklima sta paraskinia, Dinos Katsouridis
 1961 Antigone, George Tzavellas
 1961 Alice in the Navy, Alekos Sakellarios
 1961 Woe to the Young, Alekos Sakellarios, starring Dimitris Horn
 1962 Nomos 4000, Giannis Dalianidis
 1962 Electra, Michael Cacoyannis
 1962 Glory Sky, Takis Kanellopoulos
 1963 Young Aphrodites, Nikos Koundouros
 1963 The Red Lanterns, Vasilis Georgiadis
 1964 Zorba the Greek, Michael Cacoyannis, starring Anthony Quinn
 1965 And the Wife Shall Revere Her Husband, George Tzavellas
 1966 Blood on the Land, Vasilis Georgiadis
 1967 Oi kyries tis avlis, Dinos Dimopoulos
 1968 Girls in the Sun, Vasilis Georgiadis
 1970 Ipolochagos Natassa, Nikos Foskolos (tickets record)
 1971 What did you do in the war, Thanasi?, Dinos Katsouridis, starring Thanasis Veggos
 1971 Evdokia, Alexis Damianos
 1971 The Trojan Women, Michael Cacoyannis
 1972 The Countess of Corfu, starring Rena Vlachopoulou
 1972 Days of '36, Theo Angelopoulos
 1975 The Travelling Players, Theo Angelopoulos
 1977 Iphigenia, Michael Cacoyannis

Modern
 1981 Learn How to Read and Write, Son, Thodoros Maragos
 1983 Rembetiko, Costas Ferris
 1984 Loafing and Camouflage, Nikos Perakis
 1984 Voyage to Cythera, Theo Angelopoulos
 1985 Stone Years, Pantelis Voulgaris
 1986 The Beekeeper (film), Angelopoulos, starring Marcello Mastroianni
 1987 Doxobus, Fotos Lambrinos
 1988 Landscape in the Mist, Angelopoulos
 1991 The Suspended Step of the Stork, Theo Angelopoulos, starring Marcello Mastroianni
 1995 Ulysses' Gaze, Theo Angelopoulos  
 1998 Eternity and a Day, Theo Angelopoulos
 1998 Safe Sex, Reppas-Papathanasiou 
 1999 Peppermint (1999 film), Kostas Kapakas
 2003 A Touch of Spice, Tasos Boulmetis, starring Georges Corraface
 2004 Brides, Pantelis Voulgaris
 2007 El Greco, Yannis Smaragdis
 2007 Tale 57, Alexis Alexiou
2009 Dogtooth, Yorgos Lanthimos
 2009 Strella, Panos H. Koutras
 2010 Attenberg, Athina Rachel Tsangari
 2010 Homeland, Syllas Tzoumerkas
2011 Unfair World, Filippos Tsitos
2011 Alps, Yorgos Lanthimos
2011 Wasted Youth, Argyris Papadimitropoulos and Jan Vogel
2012 L, Babis Makridis
2012 Boy Eating the Bird's Food, Ektoras Lygizos
 2013 Little England, Pantelis Voulgaris
 2013 Miss Violence, Alexandros Avranas
2014 Stratos, Yannis Economidis
2014 Xenia, Panos H. Koutras
2014 A Blast, Syllas Tzoumerkas 
2015 Ouzeri Tsitsanis, Manousos Manousakis
 2015 Chevalier, Athina Rachel Tsangari
2015 Interruption, Yorgos Zois
2015 Wednesday 04:45, Alexis Alexiou
2016 Suntan, Argyris Papadimitropoulos
2017 Son of Sofia, Elina Psykou
2018 Pity, Babis Makridis
2019 Eftychia, Angelos Frantzis
2019 The Miracle of the Sargasso Sea, Syllas Tzoumerkas
2021 Moon, 66 Questions, Jacqueline Lentzou
2021 Monday, Argyris Papadimitropoulos

Notable musicals
 1963 Merikoi to protimoun kryo (Some Like it Cold), Giannis Dalianidis
 1964 Something Is Burning, Dalianidis
 1965 Kiss the Girls (1965 film), Giannis Dalianidis
 1967 Oi Thalassies oi Hadres, Giannis Dalianidis
 1968 Gorgones kai Mages, Dalianidis

Filming, distribution companies and studios

Past
 Athina Film
 Asty Films
 Dag Films
 Astra Film
 Hero Films (Greek: Ἡρώ)
 Olympia Films
 Anzervos
 Spentzos Films
 Klak Film

Current

 Finos Films (operates its own studios), founded by the major figure of Philopemen Finos
  Karagiannis Karatzopoulos 
  Novak Films (operates own studios)
  Madbox Entertainment (operates its own studios)
  Village Films Hellas (Greek branch of Village Roadshow)
  Haos Film, founded by Athina Rachel Tsangari
Heretic (production company and sales agent)
Neda Films (production company)
Blonde (production company)    
Homemade Films (production company)  
  Cinegram 
  Odeon Hellas 
  Make a Movie in Greece/Media Productions  
  Audiovisual (biggest distributor)
  Karamanos Studios (biggest studios in Greece)
 The new studios of Nu Boyana Film Studios (Nu Image) will open inside 2020 in the area of Thessaloniki

Producers
 Philopemen Finos
 Prodromos Meravidis

Renowned figures

Directors

 Alexis Alexiou
 Theo Angelopoulos
 Michael Cacoyannis
 George Pan Cosmatos
 Giannis Dalianidis
 Alexis Damianos
 Dinos Dimopoulos
 Costas Ferris
 Nikos Foskolos
 Costa Gavras
 Vasilis Georgiadis
 Constantine Giannaris
 Grigoris Grigoriou
 Takis Kanellopoulos
 Dinos Katsouridis
 Kostas Karagiannis
 Panos H. Koutras
 Nikos Koundouros
 Yorgos Lanthimos
 Orestis Laskos
 Tonia Marketaki

 Kostas Manoussakis
 Thodoros Maragos
 Nico Mastorakis
 Prodromos Meravidis
 Nikos Nikolaidis
 Nikos Perakis
 Vassilis Photopoulos
 Maria Plyta
 Alekos Sakellarios
 Yannis Smaragdis
 Spiros Stathoulopoulos
 Stelios Tatasopoulos
 Athina Rachel Tsangari
 Giorgos Tzavellas
 Syllas Tzoumerkas
 Thanasis Veggos
 Takis Vougiouklakis
 Pantelis Voulgaris

Screenwriters
 Efthymis Filippou
 Iakovos Kambanelis
 Thanos Leivaditis
 Petros Markaris
 Dimitris Psathas
 Alekos Sakellarios
 Mimis Traiforos
 Nikos Tsiforos

Actors

 Alekos Alexandrakis
 Cybele Andrianou
 Beata Asimakopoulou
 Vasilis Avlonitis
 Andreas Barkoulis
 Georges Corraface
 Vasilis Diamantopoulos
 Lavrentis Dianellos
 Chronis Exarhakos
 Spiros Focás
 Mimis Fotopoulos
 Giorgos Fountas
 Petros Fyssoun
 Giorgos Gavriilidis
 Katerina Gogou
 Costas Hajihristos
 Dimitris Horn
 Dinos Iliopoulos
 Antonis Kafetzopoulos
 Xenia Kalogeropoulou
 Kostas Karras
 Martha Karagianni
 Tzeni Karezi
 Manos Katrakis
 Tasso Kavadia
 Kostas Kazakos
 Lambros Konstantaras
 Giorgos Konstantinou
 Maro Kontou
 Marika Kotopouli
 Nikos Kourkoulos
 Marika Krevata
 Ellie Lambeti
 Zoe Laskari
 Ilya Livykou
 Vassilis Logothetidis

 Orestis Makris
 Melina Mercouri
 Alexis Minotis
 Vangelis Mourikis
 Sotiris Moustakas
 Elena Nathanael
 Christoforos Nezer
 Marika Nezer
 Sapfo Notara
 Makis Papadimitriou
 Dimitris Papamichael
 Irene Papas
 Dionyssis Papayannopoulos
 Angeliki Papoulia
 Stavros Paravas
 Daphne Patakia
 Katina Paxinou
 Vangelis Protopapas
 Nikos Rizos
 Yvonne Sanson
 Georges Sari
 Nikos Stavridis
 Smaro Stefanidou
 Stefanos Stratigos
 Anna Synodinou
 Christos Tsaganeas
 Nitsa Tsaganea
 Vasilis Tsivilikas
 Nora Valsami
 Titos Vandis
 Aimilios Veakis
 Thanasis Veggos
 Georgia Vasileiadou
 Sofia Vembo
 Rena Vlahopoulou
 Giannis Voglis
 Aliki Vougiouklaki
 Kostas Voutsas
 Sperantza Vrana
 Eleni Zafeiriou
 Pantelis Zervos

Directors of photography
 Giorgos Arvanitis

Scenographers
 Vassilis Photopoulos
 Yannis Tsarouchis

Film score composers

 Kostas Giannidis
 Manos Hatzidakis (notable: Stella, Never on Sunday, Woe to the Young, Htipokardia sto thranio)
 Kostas Kapnisis
 Eleni Karaindrou (notable: Eternity and a Day)
 Giorgos Katsaros
 Loukianos Kilaidonis (notable: The Travelling Players)
 Manos Loïzos (notable: Evdokia)
 Yannis Markopoulos
 Giorgos Mouzakis
 Vangelis Papathanassiou (notable: El Greco)
 Mimis Plessas (notable: What Did You Do in the War, Thanasi?)
 Michalis Souyioul
 Stamatis Spanoudakis
 Mikis Theodorakis (notable: Electra, Zorba the Greek, Z, The Trojan Women, Iphigenia)
 Stavros Xarchakos (notable: The Red Lanterns, Rembetiko)
 Giorgos Zambetas

See also
Greek Film Archive
Cinema of Cyprus
Cinema of Europe
Culture of Greece
Hellenic Film Academy
Hellenic Film Academy Awards
Film School of the Aristotle University
List of Greek actors
List of Greek films
List of Greek submissions for the Academy Award for Best Foreign Language Film
List of Greek award-winning films in International Film Festivals
List of highest-grossing Greek films
World cinema

References

Bibliography
 Dimitris Koliodimos, The Greek filmography, 1914 through 1996 (vols. 1 and 2), Jefferson, NC: McFarland, 1999.
 Journal of Modern Greek Studies 18.1, May 2000, Special Issue: "Greek Film."
 Vrasidas Karalis, A History of Greek Cinema, Continuum, 2012.

External links 

 Madbox Entertainment - Film production company and studios and postproduction
 myFILM.gr - Entertainment news and movie reviews (Greek)
 Modern Hellenic (Greek) film (cinema), theater and film directors, Actors
 Database of Greek films
 greek-movies.com
 Greek movies, tv series and shows database.
 Extensive history of cinema in Greece.
 Make a Movie in Greece - media productions in Greece
 Various movie theatres in Greece
Video of Peter Yiannoudes, who established Greek Cinema in Victoria, Australia in the 1950s on Culture Victoria

 
Greek culture